Hot chocolate is a beverage made by mixing chocolate with water or milk.

Hot chocolate may also refer to:

 Hot Chocolate (band), a British soul band
 Hot Chocolate (album), an album by the band Hot Chocolate
 Hot Chocolate, drag queen
 "Hot Chocolate", a song from The Polar Express (soundtrack)
 Hot Chocolates, a 1929 musical revue
 "Hot Chocolat", a song by Tomoko Kawase

See also
 Hot chocolate effect